Lodkeo Inthakoumman (born 5 September 1995) is a Laotian long-distance runner. She currently holds various Laotian national records in athletics.

References

1995 births
Living people
Laotian female long-distance runners
Southeast Asian Games medalists in athletics
Athletes (track and field) at the 2014 Asian Games
Athletes (track and field) at the 2018 Asian Games
Competitors at the 2017 Southeast Asian Games
Asian Games competitors for Laos
Southeast Asian Games medalists for Laos